Červenica is a village and municipality in Prešov District in the Prešov Region of eastern Slovakia.

History
In historical records the village was first mentioned in 1427. Until the 19th century its mines were the only source of precious opal available to Europeans.  During this period, the village was generally known, at least to outsiders, as Czernowitza.  There are possibilities for tourists to visit former opal mines in the area.

Points of interests
 Dubnik Transmitter

Geography

Genealogical resources
The records for genealogical research are available at the state archive "Statny Archiv in Kosice, Presov, Slovakia"
 Roman Catholic church records (births/marriages/deaths): 1788–1895 (parish A)
 Greek Catholic church records (births/marriages/deaths): 1773–1895 (parish B)
 Lutheran church records (births/marriages/deaths): 1784–1895 (parish B)

See also
 List of municipalities and towns in Slovakia

References

External links
 
 
http://www.statistics.sk/mosmis/eng/run.html
Surnames of living people in Cervenica

Villages and municipalities in Prešov District
Šariš